The 2010–11 Amlin Challenge Cup pool stage was the opening stage of the 15th season of the  European Challenge Cup, the second-tier competition for European rugby union clubs. It began on 7 October 2010 at Kingston Park in Newcastle with a match between Newcastle Falcons and Bourgoin, and was completed on 23 January 2011.

Twenty teams are participating in this competition; they are divided into five pools of four teams each, with each team playing the others home and away. Competition points are earned using the standard bonus point system. The pool winners advanced to the knockout stage, where they were joined by three entrants from the Heineken Cup pool stage. These teams will then competed in a single-elimination tournament that will end with the final on 20 May 2011 in Cardiff at Cardiff City Stadium.

Results
All times are local to the game location.

{| class="wikitable"
|+ Key to colours
|-
|bgcolor="#ccffcc"|    
|Winner of each pool advances to quarterfinals. Seed # in parentheses.
|}

Pool 1

Pool 2

Pool 3

 <small>:  Bourgoin were awarded a five-point 28–0 win by the ERC after Newcastle refused to play and left before a pitch inspection on January 23.

Pool 4

Pool 5

See also
European Challenge Cup
2010–11 Heineken Cup

References

pool stage
2010-11